National Highway 166F, commonly referred to as NH 166F is a national highway in India. It is a secondary route of National Highway 66.  NH-166F runs in the state of Maharashtra in India.

Route 
NH166F connects Mahad and Raigad Fort in the state of Maharashtra.

Junctions  
 
  Terminal near Mahad.

See also 
 List of National Highways in India
 List of National Highways in India by state

References

External links 

 NH 166F on OpenStreetMap

National highways in India
National Highways in Maharashtra